The Kid from Texas is a 1950 American Western film that was Audie Murphy's first Technicolor Western and the first feature film on Murphy's Universal-International Pictures contract. It was directed by Kurt Neumann and featured Gale Storm and Albert Dekker.

Plot
The film starts 11 July 1879 in Lincoln County, New Mexico Territory. A group of men who work for Major Harper, led by gunslinger Minniger, attempt to arrest rancher Alexander Kain and his English partner Jameson. They are stopped by William Bonney, aka Billy the Kid, who shoots and injures them.

Jameson offers Billy a job as a ranch hand. A drunken group of Harper's men attack the ranch and kill Jameson. Billy goes on a killing rampage, encouraged by the manipulative Kain, who publicly decries Billy's efforts. Governor Lew Wallace offers Billy a pardon which he turns down. Pat Garrett is sent to catch Billy.

Cast
 Audie Murphy as Billy the Kid
 Gale Storm as Irene Kain
 Albert Dekker as Alexander Kain
 Shepperd Strudwick as Jameson
 Will Geer as O'Fallon
 William Talman as Minniger
 Martin Garralaga as Morales
 Robert H. Barrat as General Lew Wallace
 Walter Sande as Crowe
 Frank Wilcox as Pat Garrett
 Dennis Hoey as Major Harper
 Ray Teal as Sheriff Rand 
 Don Haggerty as Morgan
 Paul Ford as Sheriff Copeland 
 John Phillips as Sid Curtis
 Harold Goodwin as Matt Curtis
 Zon Murray as Lucas 
 Tom Trout as Denby 
 Rosa Turich as Maria 
 Dorita Pallais as Lupita
 Pilar Del Rey as Marguarita

Production notes
The film fictionalises the true events of the Lincoln County War but follows the basic facts. Jameson (Shepperd Strudwick) is based on John Tunstall and Alexander Kain (Albert Dekker) on Alexander McSween.

Murphy was cast after his performance as a juvenile delinquent in Bad Boy, with Billy the Kid being depicted as a 19th-century juvenile delinquent. J. Edgar Hoover offered to narrate the film. However, Parley Baer was chosen as the narrator.

References

External links

The Kid from Texas at Audie Murphy Memorial Site

1950 films
1950 Western (genre) films
American Western (genre) films
Biographical films about Billy the Kid
Cultural depictions of Pat Garrett
Films set in 1879
Films set in New Mexico
Films directed by Kurt Neumann
Lincoln County Wars
Audie Murphy
Universal Pictures films
1950s English-language films
1950s American films